The 2017–18 Serie B de México season was split into two tournaments, the Apertura and the Clausura. Serie B is the fourth-tier football league of Mexico. The season was played between 11 August 2017 and 12 May 2018.

Torneo Apertura

Changes from the previous season
28 teams participated in this season:

Deportivo San Juan moved to San Miguel de Allende and became Inter San Miguel.
Colibríes de Malinalco moved to Huixquilucan and became Tecamachalco F.C.
Vikingos F.C. changed its name to Ciervos F.C.
Titanes de Saltillo changed its name to Atlético Saltillo Soccer.
Deportivo CAFESSA, Constructores de Gómez Palacio, Isleños del Carmen and Deportivo Zitácuaro were admitted as expansion teams.
Atlético Lagunero, Garzas UAEH and Patriotas de Córdoba disappeared.
Alacranes Rojos de Apatzingán was relegated to Tercera División.
Tlaxcala F.C. reserve team played this season in Serie B.
Albinegros de Orizaba, Chapulineros de Oaxaca, Ocelotes UNACH, Tuzos UAZ and Leones Negros UdeG Premier played Serie B for not having the necessary sports infrastructure for Serie A.
Between Apertura 2017 and Clausura 2018, Isleños del Carmen moved to Villahermosa, Tabasco and changed its name to Cocodrilos de Tabasco.

Stadiums and Locations

Group 1

Group 2 
{{Location map+ |Mexico |width=500|float=right |caption=Location of teams in the 2017–18 Serie B Group 2 |places=

Regular season

Group 1

Standings

Results

Group 2

Standings

Results

Regular season statistics

Scoring 
First goal of the season: Hamblet Gaona (Ocelotes UNACH)

Top goalscorers 
Players sorted first by goals scored, then by last name.

Source: Liga Premier

Attendance

Per team

Highest and lowest

Source:Liga Premier FMF (available in each game report)

Liguilla

The four best teams of each group play two games against each other on a home-and-away basis. The higher seeded teams play on their home field during the second leg. The winner of each match up is determined by aggregate score. In the quarterfinals and semifinals, if the two teams are tied on aggregate the higher seeded team advances. In the final, if the two teams are tied after both legs, the match goes to extra time and, if necessary, a penalty shoot-out.

Quarter-finals
The first legs was played on 10 and 11 November 2017, and the second legs was played on 18 and 19 November 2017.

First leg

Second leg

Semi-finals
The first legs was played on 22 November, and the second legs was played on 25 November 2017.

First leg

Second leg

Final
The first leg was played on 30 November, and the second leg was played on 3 December 2017.

First leg

Second leg

Torneo Clausura

Regular season

Group 1

Standings

Results

Group 2

Standings

Results

Regular season statistics

Scoring 
First goal of the season: Jesús López (Dorados Premier)

Top goalscorers 
Players sorted first by goals scored, then by last name.

Source: Liga Premier

Attendance

Per team

Highest and lowest

Source:Liga Premier FMF (available in each game report)

Liguilla

The four best teams of each group play two games against each other on a home-and-away basis. The higher seeded teams play on their home field during the second leg. The winner of each match up is determined by aggregate score. In the quarterfinals and semifinals, if the two teams are tied on aggregate the higher seeded team advances. In the final, if the two teams are tied after both legs, the match goes to extra time and, if necessary, a penalty shoot-out.

(*) Team was classified by its position in the season table

Quarter-finals
The first leg was played on 6, 7 and 8 April, and the second leg was played on 14 and 15 April 2018.

First leg

Second leg

Semi-finals
The first leg was played on 18 April, and the second leg was played on 21 April 2018.

First leg

Second leg

Final
The first leg was played on 25 April, and the second leg was played on 28 April 2018.

First leg

Second leg

Relegation Table 

Last updated: 1 April 2018 Source: Liga Premier FMFP = Position; G = Games played; Pts = Points; Pts/G = Ratio of points to games played

Promotion Final
The Promotion Final is a series of matches played by the champions of the tournaments Apertura and Clausura, the game is played to determine the winning team of the promotion to Serie A. 
The first leg was played on 3 May 2018, and the second leg was played on 6 May 2018.

First leg

Second leg

See also 
2017–18 Liga MX season
2017–18 Ascenso MX season
2017–18 Serie A de Mexico season

References

External links
 Official website of Liga Premier
 Magazine page 

 
1